Al Muntazah is a supermarket chain in the Kingdom of Bahrain. It is believed to be the biggest supermarket chain in the kingdom. Al Muntazah Markets is the subsidiary of Almeer Group which was founded in 1905.

In 1984, the Almeer Group opened the first Al Muntazah Market outlet in Muharraq. The Al Muntazah footprint has been steadily extended across the country with a further ten supermarkets.

In 2013, Al Muntazah Markets expanded its non-food retail business by opening Al Muntazah Stationery in Muharraq, selling stationery products and providing photocopying services aimed at businesses, educational institutes and students.

In 2015, the company further extended its operations by opening its first Al Muntazah Express branch in Muharraq. The second express branch is due to open in the city of Rifa'a by the first quarter of 2016.

The supermarkets do not sell cigarettes; nor do they sell pork, or products containing alcohol, in line with Islamic principles. Some outlets are open 24 hours a day (Muharraq, Rifa'a and Hoora branch), depending on their location and local demand.

In 2002, the supermarket chain led a consumer boycott of American brands against Israel's hostility towards Palestinians in West Bank and the Occupied Territories.

Al Muntazah has branches in Manama, Muharraq, Kazino, Galali, Rifa'a, Arad, Hamad Town, Hoora, Sitra and Isa Town.

References

1980s establishments in Bahrain
Supermarkets of Bahrain